Clive Syddall is a British filmmaker and television journalist noted for several campaigning documentaries.

Life and career
In 1969 after a year as a graduate trainee with Southern Television, he joined the BBC as a producer and director on 24 Hours, Midweek and later Panorama where he produced films from the front line in Northern Ireland, the Middle East and Southern Africa.

His credits included the BAFTA award winning BBC series River Journeys, the documentary Gang City – the story of the ongoing gang warfare in the Olympic City of Los Angeles for the BBC2, Lost in Africa - the fight to save 100,000 children separated from their parents by the civil war in Rwanda for Channel 4; and The Last Flight of Zulu Delta 576 (Channel 4). Investigation into the Chinook helicopter crash over the Mull of Kintyre killing 29 of Britain’s top secret service personnel originally blamed on the two pilots for gross negligence and their parent’s fight to clear their names.(1997)

He was Council member of the Royal Television Society, Trustee of Marie Curie 1991-1994 and Director of Kirtlington Park Ltd (2012–17).

In 2000 he formed a joint venture with Emmy-award winning director Bill Cran and formed  PITV which produced a number of award winning programmes for international distribution.

Filmography 
His credits as Executive Producer/Producer/or Director include:

 Jihad – The Men and Ideas behind Al-Qaeda. Emmy Nomination – Outstanding Historical Programme. (2008)
Sinatra – Dark Star 1 x90’ (BBC1). Sinatra’s connections to the Mafia leaders. Grierson nomination for Best Arts Documentary. (2008)
 1421 – The Year China Discovered America 120’. (1990)
 An Islamic Conscience – The Aga Khan and the Ismailis – 60’ film for cinema, television and DVD to coincide with the Aga Khan’s Golden Jubilee. (2008)
A Bitter Harvest - The killing fields of Mindanao. For Twenty Twenty Television and Channel 4. (1987)
Pasternak - a major part of the celebrations marking the centenary of Pasternak’s birth and the first co-production between the British film industry and the Soviet state film company Video-film”. (1990)
Harem TV mini series. (2003)
 Extreme Oil 3. Cine Golden Eagle Award. (2004)
Plague Wars  documentary mini series. (1998)  
A Death in Venice – BBC2 The Works. (1997)
An Ordinary Boy – New York International Film & TV Festival award. (1993)
 The Shearing Touch  –  International New York Film & TV Festival award. (1991)
 1867 – The Execution of Maximilian - Gold Medal Award, New York International Film & TV Festival. (1991)

References 

British documentary film directors
Living people
Year of birth missing (living people)
British filmmakers